Santa Cruz Acatepec is a town and municipality in Oaxaca in south-western Mexico. The municipality covers an area of 14.03 km². 
It is part of the Teotitlán District in the north of the Cañada Region.

As of 2005, the municipality had a total population of 1301.

References

Municipalities of Oaxaca